Pseudoparis is a genus of perennial monocotyledonous flowering plants in the family Commelinaceae, first described in 1936. The genus contains three known species, all endemic to Madagascar.

 Species
 Pseudoparis cauliflora H.Perrier 1936
 Pseudoparis monandra H.Perrier 1936
 Pseudoparis tenera (Baker) Faden 1991

References

 

Commelinaceae
Endemic flora of Madagascar
Commelinales genera
Taxa named by Joseph Marie Henry Alfred Perrier de la Bâthie